Nandyal Diocese is a diocese of Church of South India in Andhra Pradesh state of India. The diocese is one among the 22 dioceses of Church of South India in India.

History
The first missionaries who came to Nandyal were Arthur Inman and Alfred Briton in the year 1881. These two missionaries were responsible to establish the SPG High School in 1884 and to build the Holy Cross Church in 1905 in Nandyal. These two missionaries who resided in Nandyal lived in tents and went about preaching the gospel in and around Nandyal in various villages and building churches. Their mode of travel in those days were bullock carts on most primitive roads or cart tracks. They learned the local language Telugu and traveled extensively beyond Nandyal to place like Kurnool, Giddalur, Kalasapad, Atmakur and Nandikotkur and planted churches in the villages. In this church first SPG Telugu Graduate Priest Rev. David Gnanamuthu served from 1912 to 1923, he came from Medras Christian Theological College, Madras (1885 to 1890) and his son Re. John Yesudas Gnanamuthu served in this diocese.

When Dornakal diocese (of which it was then a part) joined the united Church of South India in 1947, Nandyal instead chose to remain in the Indian Anglican church, under the Diocese of Calcutta. Nandyal diocese was formed on 29 April 1963, initially as part of Church of India (CIPBC); with that church, it united into the Church of North India in 1970, and the Nandyal diocese eventually joined the Church of South India on 6 July 1975.

The cathedral church of the diocese is CSI Holy Cross Cathedral in Nandyal.

Bishops
In 1950, Arthur Partridge was consecrated Bishop in Nandyal, an assistant bishop in the Diocese of Calcutta; he served until Nandyal diocese was erected and returned to the UK.
 1963–1967, Clement Venkataramiah
 1967–1974, Ernest John 
 1977–1985, Pabbathi John
 1985–1992, Ryder Devapriam
 1994–2005, Rt.Rev. Dr. Gondi Theodore Abraham 
 2006–2012, P. J. Lawrence 
 2013 onwards, E. Pushpa Lalitha

Notable ecclesiastical personalities
 Bunyan Joseph, Bishop of erstwhile Anantapur-Kurnool Diocese (integrated into Rayalaseema Diocese),
 B. E. Devaraj, translator of the Bible into Lambadi language,
 Pabbathi John, First Bishop of Nandyal Diocese Nandyal Diocese,
 Emani Sambayya, non-episcopal commissary to Nandyal,

Educational institutions in the diocese
The SPG High School, Nandyal, was established in the year 1882.

Further reading

References

External links
All Saints Church Nandyal

Nandyal
Christianity in Andhra Pradesh
Kurnool district

Christian organizations established in 1963
1963 establishments in Andhra Pradesh